Taught to Be Proud is the fourth studio album by Tea Leaf Green. It was originally released on November 15, 2005 through Reincarnate Music.

Track listing 
 "The Garden, Pt. 3" - 4:01
 "Taught to Be Proud" - 5:27
 "Rapture" - 4:55
 "If It Wasn't for the Money" - 3:16
 "I've Been Seeking" - 4:58
 "John Brown" - 6:19
 "Pretty Jane" - 3:59
 "5000 Acres" - 6:06
 "Morning Sun" - 5:45
 "Ride Together" - 5:36
 "Flippin' the Bird" - 3:42
 All songs are credited to Trevor Garrod.

Personnel
Tea Leaf Green:
 Josh Clark - guitar, vocals
 Ben Chambers - bass, vocals
 Scott Rager - drums
 Trevor Garrod - keyboards, vocals

Production:
 Jeff Adams - coordination
 John Ilewelyn Evans - conga, engineer
 Tom Flye - mixing
 Joe Gastwirt - mastering
 Robert Gatley - engineer
 Fred Hayes - cover photo
 Mark Humphreys - engineer
 Mike McGinn - engineer

References

External links
 List of albums on the band's official website (archived as of November 2006)

2005 albums
Tea Leaf Green albums